Tambre is a comune (municipality) in the Province of Belluno in the Italian region Veneto, located about  north of Venice and about  east of Belluno. 
 
Tambre borders the following municipalities: Aviano, Barcis, Budoia, Caneva, Chies d'Alpago, Alpago, Fregona, Polcenigo, Puos d'Alpago.

References

External links
 Official website

Cities and towns in Veneto